Gilmore Girls is an American comedy-drama television series created by Amy Sherman-Palladino and starring Lauren Graham (Lorelai Gilmore) and Alexis Bledel (Rory Gilmore). The show debuted on October 5, 2000, on The WB and became a flagship series for the network. Gilmore Girls ran for seven seasons, the final season moving to The CW and ending its run on May 15, 2007.

Gilmore Girls received critical acclaim for its witty dialogue, cross-generational appeal, and effective mix of humor and drama. It was a success for The WB, peaking during season five as the network's second-most-popular show. The series has been in daily syndication since 2004, while a growing following has led to its status as a 2000s American cult classic. Since going off the air in 2007, Gilmore Girls has been cited in TV (The Book) and Time magazine as one of the 100 greatest television shows of all time. In 2016, the main cast and Sherman-Palladino returned for the four-part miniseries revival Gilmore Girls: A Year in the Life, which streamed on Netflix and later aired on The CW.

Premise 

This show follows the lives of a  
30-something single mother Lorelai Gilmore and her intellectual teenage daughter Rory Gilmore as the two women have strong ambitions they try so desperately to achieve: Lorelai wants to own her own inn while Rory wants to attend the prestigious Harvard University while also dealing with Lorelai's appearance-obsessive and very wealthy parents, Emily and Richard Gilmore, who pay for Rory's tuition at an exclusive private school in Hartford, Connecticut.

This sets up one of the show's primary, ongoing conflicts: the Gilmore family is forced to face their differences and complicated past, their interactions fueled by these weekly Friday night dinners together. The contrasting mother-daughter relationships of Emily/Lorelai and Lorelai/Rory become a defining theme of the show and a lens through which many of the female relationships are viewed.

Throughout the series, one of the main characters and Rory's best friend, Lane Kim's love life is followed in addition to those of Lorelai and Rory. As the daughter of Mrs. Kim, a very strict, religious, and protective Korean immigrant, Lane struggles to hide her love for rock music and other aspects of pop culture from her mother, including dating. While Mrs. Kim repeatedly tries to find Lane a future Korean husband who is medical school-bound, she dates Henry Cho, one of Rory's Chilton classmates, Dave Rygalski, the guitarist in Lane's secret band, and Zach Van Gerbig, the lead singer of the same band whom she later marries.

The quirky townspeople of Stars Hollow are a constant presence. Along with series-long and season-long arcs, Gilmore Girls is also episodic in nature, with mini-plots within each episode — such as town festivals, issues at Lorelai's inn, or school projects of Rory's.

One writer later said that the brief given to the writing room at the outset was "This show is about a mother and a daughter who are best friends as well as being mother and daughter, and every conflict and dynamic should ticktack back and forth on that one point."

Synopsis

Season 1 

Rory is accepted to Chilton, a private school that would get her to her lifelong dream to study at Harvard. Because of the heavy price tag the private school comes with, Lorelai talks to her wealthy parents, with whom she has not communicated for a long time. Emily and Richard agree to pay for the tuition, although there is a catch; that Lorelai and Rory would have Friday night dinners with them. Rory has a difficult time settling in at Chilton, struggling to match the demands of private school and attracting the fury of classmate Paris Geller, her academic rival. She meets her first boyfriend, Dean, but the pair break up when Rory doesn't reciprocate his "I love you", instead saying "thank you". Rory spends the remainder of the season saddened by her break up. After being romantically pursued by Rory's teacher, Max Medina, Lorelai decides with a conflicted heart to give the relationship a chance. This dynamic creates some tension between Lorelai and Rory, especially after Lorelai is seen kissing Max in Rory's school. Lorelai becomes frightened by her feelings for Max and breaks up with him. At the same time, Lorelai harbors a close friendship with local diner owner Luke Danes, and several people comment on their mutual attraction—but Lorelai is in denial and Luke does not act on it. Rory's father, Christopher Hayden, returns and also wants to be with Lorelai but she tells him he is too immature for family life. All the while, Lorelai struggles to adjust to having her parents in her life on a regular basis. Emily and Richard enjoy developing a relationship with their granddaughter, but also realize how much they have missed. The season ends with Rory reuniting with Dean, and Max proposing to Lorelai.

Season 2 

Lorelai accepts Max's proposal but realizes shortly before the wedding that it does not feel right and they break up. This decision is preceded by a drunken phone call she makes to her ex, Christopher Hayden at her Bachelorette party. She and Sookie get excited about opening their own business at the dilapidated Dragonfly Inn but the owner refuses to sell. Sookie gets engaged to Jackson Belleville, a local farmer. Luke's teenage nephew, Jess Mariano, comes to live under his care. Jess is sullen and angry with everyone apart from Rory. The two strike up a friendship, causing jealousy from Dean. Lorelai is disapproving of their closeness, labeling Jess as a bad influence, especially when they are in a car accident, in which Rory breaks her wrist. This leads to a blow-up between Lorelai and Luke. Richard announces that he has retired but soon becomes bored and sets up his own insurance company. Christopher appears to have his life together and Lorelai decides to reunite with him. But at Sookie's wedding, Christopher learns that his recently estranged fiancée is pregnant and decides to return to her, leaving Lorelai heartbroken. Meanwhile, Rory impulsively kisses Jess.

Season 3 

Rory's attraction to Jess grows stronger but Jess doesn't show affection or knowledge that it is, and she gets jealous when he teases her with a new girlfriend. Dean cannot ignore what is going on and eventually ends their relationship. Rory and Jess immediately become a couple. Meanwhile, she and Paris spend the year as Student Body Presidents at Chilton and both submit applications to Harvard University. They spend a portion of the season in a rivalry with fellow student, Francie, who causes a rift between Paris and Rory. Paris and Rory eventually make amends when Paris confides in her that she lost her virginity. Her college decision plays a big part in Rory's senior year. Harvard is her dream school, but she applies to Yale as well, which causes a rift between Lorelai and Emily and Richard. Paris is devastated when she does not get into Harvard. Rory is accepted but decides to attend Yale University instead, much to Emily and Richard's delight. The Independence Inn is badly damaged in a fire, but Lorelai and Sookie are able to buy the Dragonfly when its elderly owner dies. Jess pressures Rory into almost having sex with him, leading to a fist fight between Dean and Jess when the former witnesses an upset Rory. Luke begins dating a lawyer named Nicole. Lane Kim, Rory's best friend, starts a band called Hep Alien and tries to convince her strict mother to let her date the guitarist, Dave, all while keeping the band secret. As the season ends, Jess abruptly leaves Stars Hollow to track down his estranged father in California, and Rory graduates high school as valedictorian.

Season 4 

Rory starts her college education at Yale, with Paris – now a friend – as her surprise roommate. Both start working for the Yale Daily News. Rory is surprised when Dean abruptly marries his new girlfriend, Lindsey. Rory and Dean grow close again over the season, leading Rory to turn down Jess when he returns and declares his love for her. Lorelai, along with Sookie and their colleague Michel, spends the season renovating the Dragonfly Inn in preparation for its opening. Lorelai faces financial hardships during this period, ultimately breaking down to Luke who subsequently lends her the money. Lorelai begins dating Richard's new business partner, Jason Stiles, with whom she has been acquainted since childhood. She keeps the relationship a secret from her parents. Lane's mother learns about Hep Alien and kicks Lane out of the house. Sookie and Jackson have a son, Davey. Lorelai and Jason break up after Jason sues Richard for leaving their partnership, while Lorelai sides with her father. Emily feels neglected by Richard and the two separate, with Richard moving into the pool house. Luke and Nicole elope during a cruise, but decide to divorce soon after. Towards the end of the season, Luke accepts that he is in love with Lorelai and begins wooing her. The pair finally kiss on the Dragonfly's opening night, while Rory loses her virginity to a married Dean.

Season 5 

Facing conflict with her mother, Rory embarks on a European trip with Emily and seldom speaks with Lorelai. Near the end of the trip, Lorelai and Rory reconcile over the phone, and Rory asks Lorelai to give Dean a letter for her. Dean's wife finds the letter, which contains information about the affair. Dean and his wife consequently separate. Rory briefly progresses her relationship with Dean but it ends when he realizes how different their lives are. She falls for Logan Huntzberger, a wealthy playboy Yale student whose parents and grandfather consider Rory's lineage inferior to their own. Lane starts a relationship with her bandmate Zack, and Paris starts a relationship with Yale Daily News editor Doyle. Sookie gives birth to her daughter, Martha. Lorelai and Luke start a relationship. Emily and Richard – who reunite and renew their wedding vows – disapprove of Luke, and Emily interferes by telling Christopher to try to win her back. Christopher shows up at Emily and Richard's vow renewal, professing his love for Lorelai, which overwhelms Luke, resulting in separation between him and Lorelai, as well as a major argument between Lorelai and Emily. Rory gets an internship at Logan's father's newspaper but is deflated when he tells her she "doesn't have it." Rory lashes out afterwards and suggests to Logan, at his sister's engagement party, that they steal a yacht. The two are arrested, and Rory later announces to Lorelai that she is quitting Yale, and moves into her grandparents' pool house. When Lorelai sees how supportive Luke is over the situation, she asks him to marry her.

Season 6 

Lorelai is disappointed by Rory's actions but concedes that she cannot force her back to Yale; it is a decision Rory must make for herself. Mother and daughter do not speak for six months. Rory has to complete community service and Emily finds her a job with the DAR. Richard becomes concerned with Rory's engaging in the socialite lifestyle without continuing her education. Eventually, after admonishment from Jess, Rory returns to Yale and reunites with Lorelai. She later replaces Paris as editor of the Yale Daily News, which causes a disruption in their friendship. After a short separation from Logan, the relationship gets serious. Rory is crushed when Logan's father sends him to work in London. Hep Alien disband then come back together. Lane and Zack get married after Zach undergoes a rigorous vetting from Mrs. Kim. Lorelai plans a wedding with Luke, but things get difficult when Luke learns that he has a 12-year-old daughter named April. He starts building a relationship with her but keeps Lorelai separate. Lorelai tries to accept this but eventually snaps and issues him an ultimatum. When he does not agree to elope, Lorelai goes to Christopher for physical and emotional comfort.

Season 7 

Lorelai and Luke officially split when she tells him she slept with Christopher. Before much time has passed, Christopher convinces Lorelai to try a relationship. Christopher receives a letter from Sherry Tinsdale, who is his ex-girlfriend and the mother of his second child, Georgia. The letter states she wants to be a part of Georgia's life again and requests that she spend time with her in Paris. Lorelai and Christopher decide to go with Georgia to get her settled. The pair spontaneously marry during the trip to Paris. Luke has a custody battle over April after her mother moves them to New Mexico, and he asks Lorelai to write him a character reference. Luke ends up winning the right to see April during the holidays. Christopher finds what Lorelai wrote about Luke and is upset. Lorelai and Christopher accept that they are not right together and they divorce, though the divorce is never shown or mentioned subsequently. Lane and Zack have twins, and Sookie becomes pregnant again. Rory completes her final year of college. She and Logan spend half the season in a long-distance relationship until he eventually moves back to New York. He proposes, but Rory says that she wants to keep her options open, which leads to their separation. She panics about what she will do after graduating; following some rejection, she gets a job reporting on the Barack Obama campaign trail. Stars Hollow throws a surprise farewell party for Rory. When Lorelai finds out that Luke organized it, the pair reconcile with a kiss. Lorelai promises Emily that she will continue attending Friday night dinners. Before Lorelai and Rory have to say goodbye, they have one last breakfast at Luke's Diner.

A Year in the Life 

Nine years after the end of the original series, Netflix produced a Gilmore Girls revival miniseries. Rory is struggling in her journalism career and having a no-strings-attached, secret affair with Logan in London, while technically having a boyfriend named Paul that she often forgets about. While Logan is engaged to be married, the two of them cannot seem to stay apart. Lorelai and Luke live together but are still having communication problems. Richard has recently died of a heart attack, which causes tension between Lorelai and Emily, and they end up in joint therapy. Lorelai starts to question her life, so she travels to California with intentions to hike the Pacific Crest Trail, where she has an epiphany. She fixes the rift with Emily by recounting a happy story about Richard, and goes home to propose to Luke. Emily decides to sell the Gilmore mansion and move to Nantucket, where she starts working in a museum. After encouragement from Jess, Rory decides to write a book about her life called Gilmore Girls. After Luke and Lorelai marry, Rory informs Lorelai that she is pregnant.

The miniseries aired on Up TV and The CW in November 2020, partly because the latter network needed additional programming to fill its schedule during the COVID-19 pandemic.

Cast and characters

Main
 Lauren Graham as Lorelai Gilmore: Independent, 30-something single mom who runs a local inn with a deep love for pop culture and coffee. She gave birth to Rory when she was 16 years old. She and Sookie later buy and own the Dragonfly Inn. 
 Alexis Bledel as Rory Gilmore: Precocious and academically driven only-daughter of Lorelai, almost 16 at the start of the show. 
 Melissa McCarthy as Sookie St. James: Lorelai's chirpy best friend and chef/co-owner at the inn.
 Keiko Agena as Lane Kim: Rory's best friend who lives a secret life, defying her strict, religious mother by becoming a rocker.
 Yanic Truesdale as Michel Gerard: The grumpy French concierge at Lorelai and Sookie's inn.
 Scott Patterson as Luke Danes: Grouchy but kind-hearted diner owner; Lorelai's friend and eventual love interest. 
 Kelly Bishop as Emily Gilmore: Matriarch of the Gilmore family, who lives as a high society housewife. She and Lorelai have a strained relationship. 
 Edward Herrmann as Richard Gilmore: Intellectual patriarch of the Gilmore family, who works in insurance. He and Emily aid in Rory's school fees and college fees. 
 Liza Weil as Paris Geller: Rory's feisty nemesis and eventual friend throughout high school and college. (main seasons 2–7; recurring season 1)
 Jared Padalecki as Dean Forester: Rory's season 1–3 boyfriend, who moved to Stars Hollow from Chicago. He later marries and divorces Lindsay after cheating on her with Rory. (main seasons 2–3; recurring seasons 1, 4–5)
 Milo Ventimiglia as Jess Mariano: Luke's troubled nephew who falls for Rory and becomes an intense but short-lived boyfriend. He moves away to live with his father at the end of season 3. (main seasons 2–3; recurring season 4; guest season 6)
 Sean Gunn as Kirk Gleason: Quirky resident of Stars Hollow who works numerous jobs around the town. He shows romantic interest in Lorelai but is rejected. He later dates a girl called Lulu - they are still dating in Gilmore Girls Year in the Life. (main seasons 3–7; recurring seasons 1–2)
 Chris Eigeman as Jason Stiles a boyfriend of Lorelai and short-lived business partner of Richard. (main season 4)
 Matt Czuchry as Logan Huntzberger: Rory's season 5–7 boyfriend, the heir of a New York Times-esque publishing family resembling that of the Ochs-Sulzberger family. (main seasons 6–7; recurring season 5)

Recurring
 Liz Torres as Miss Patty, the friendly and kind-hearted town dance teacher and gossip
 Emily Kuroda as Mrs. Kim, Lane's strict Seventh-day Adventist mother who has a strained relationship with her daughter
 Sally Struthers as Babette Dell, Lorelai's eccentric but friendly neighbor and town gossip - she is close friends with Patty
 Jackson Douglas as Jackson Belleville, Sookie's husband and a local farmer He and Sookie share two children throughout the show
 Michael Winters as Taylor Doose, the uptight town Selectman who often irrates Luke with his requests and rules
 David Sutcliffe as Christopher Hayden, Rory's father and Lorelai's on-off love interest (seasons 1–3; 5–7)
 Shelly Cole as Madeline Lynn, Paris and Rory's high school friend (seasons 1–4)
 Teal Redmann as Louise Grant, Paris and Rory's high school friend (seasons 1–4)
 Scott Cohen as Max Medina, Lorelai's season one boyfriend and brief fiancé, and Rory's English teacher at Chilton (seasons 1–3)
 Chad Michael Murray as Tristin DuGray, a wealthy Chilton student who has a crush on Rory who is later transferred due to his bad behaviour (seasons 1–2)
 Dakin Matthews as Hanlin Charleston, Headmaster of Chilton and friend of Richard and Emily (seasons 1–4)
 Marion Ross as Lorelai "Trix" Gilmore, Richard's mean mother who takes pleasure in criticising Emily (seasons 1–4)
 Lisa Ann Hadley as Rachel, Luke's photographer and traveler ex-girlfriend (season 1)
 Alex Borstein as Drella, the Independence Inn harpist (season 1), and "Miss Celine", Emily Gilmore's seamstress (season 5)
 Rose Abdoo as Gypsy, the town mechanic (seasons 2–7)
 Carole King as Sophie Bloom, owner of the Sophie's Music shop which Lane frequents often (seasons 2, 5–6)
 Biff Yeager as Tom, a Stars Hollow contractor (seasons 2–4; 6)
 Emily Bergl as Francie Jarvis, a student at Chilton (seasons 2–3)
 Todd Lowe as Zach Van Gerbig, Lane's bandmate and eventual husband and father to their twin sons (seasons 3–7)
 John Cabrera as Brian Fuller, Lane's bandmate (seasons 3–7)
 Tricia O'Kelley as Nicole Leahy, Luke's season 3–4 lawyer girlfriend and short-term wife (seasons 3–4)
 Arielle Kebbel as Lindsay Lister, Dean's girlfriend and wife - they divorce later on when he cheats on her with Rory (seasons 3–5)
 Adam Brody as Dave Rygalski, Lane's bandmate and season 3 boyfriend - they break up later on when Dave moves to college (season 3) (Dave was written out due to Brody's commitments to the O.C.) 
 Sebastian Bach as Gil, Lane's older bandmate (seasons 4–7)
 Danny Strong as Doyle McMaster, Paris's boyfriend and one-time editor of the Yale Daily News (seasons 4–7)
 Kathleen Wilhoite as Liz Danes, Luke's flighty and irresponsible sister and Jess's mother (seasons 4–7)
 Michael DeLuise as TJ, Luke's dopey but kind-hearted brother-in-law (seasons 4–7)
 Wayne Wilcox as Marty, Rory's friend at Yale who has unrequited feelings for her (seasons 4–5; 7)
 Rini Bell as Lulu Kuschner, Kirk's girlfriend (seasons 4–7)
 Alan Loayza as Colin McCrae, Logan's wealthy friend (seasons 5–6)
 Tanc Sade as Finn, Logan's wealthy friend (seasons 5–6)
 Gregg Henry as Mitchum Huntzberger, Logan's father and a newspaper mogul (seasons 5–7)
 Vanessa Marano as of April Nardini, Luke's "long lost" pre-teen daughter whom he finds out about in season 6 (seasons 6–7)
 Sherilyn Fenn as Anna Nardini, April's mother and Luke's ex-girlfriend (seasons 6–7)
 Krysten Ritter as Lucy, Rory's friend (season 7)
 Michelle Ongkingco as Olivia Marquont, Rory's friend (season 7)

Production

Background 

Amy Sherman-Palladino, who came from a background of writing for half-hour sitcoms, had Gilmore Girls approved by The WB after several of her previous pitches were turned down. On a whim, she suggested a show about a mother and daughter but had put little thought into the idea. Having to create a pilot, she drew inspiration for the show's setting of "Stars Hollow, Connecticut", after making a trip to Washington Depot, Connecticut, where she stayed at the Mayflower Inn. She explained: "If I can make people feel this much of what I felt walking around this fairy town, I thought that would be wonderful ... At the time I was there, it was beautiful, it was magical, and it was a feeling of warmth and small-town camaraderie ... There was a longing for that in my own life, and I thought—that's something that I would really love to put out there." Stars Hollow was inspired by and is loosely based on the actual villages of Washington Depot, Connecticut; West Hartford, Connecticut, and the town of New Milford.

Once the setting was established, Gilmore Girls developed as a mixture of sitcom and family drama. Sherman-Palladino's aim was to create "A family show that doesn't make parents want to stick something sharp in their eyes while they're watching it and doesn't talk down to kids." She wanted the family dynamic to be important because "It's a constant evolution ... You never run out of conflict." The show's pace, dialogue, and focus on class divisions was heavily inspired by the screwball comedies of the 1930s and Katharine Hepburn–Spencer Tracy films. Sherman-Palladino was also influenced by the "acerbic wit" of Dorothy Parker.

The pilot episode of Gilmore Girls received financial support from the script development fund of the Family Friendly Programming Forum, which includes some of the nation's leading advertisers, making it one of the first networks shows to reach the air with such funding. The show was green-lit by The WB, and Sherman-Palladino proceeded to exercise control over all aspects of its production. Her husband Daniel Palladino was a consultant and occasional writer for the first season, then agreed to quit his producer position on Family Guy to commit to Gilmore Girls; he became an executive producer with the second season, and also played a major role. The show's third executive producer was Gavin Polone.

Casting

Alexis Bledel was cast in the key role of Rory despite having no previous acting experience. Sherman-Palladino was drawn to her shyness and innocence, which she said was essential for the character, and felt she photographed well. Lauren Graham was pursued by the casting directors from the start of the process, but she was committed to another show on NBC. A week before the shooting, they had still failed to cast Lorelai, so they asked Graham to audition anyway. Sherman-Palladino cast her that day, on the hope that Graham's other show (M.Y.O.B., which was burned off as a summer replacement series several months before the premiere of Gilmore Girls) would be canceled, which it soon was. She later explained how Graham met all the criteria she had been looking for: "Lorelai's a hard fucking part. You've got to be funny, you've got to talk really fucking fast, you've got to be able to act, you've got to be sexy, but not scary sexy. You've got to be strong, but not like 'I hate men. Graham and Bledel only met the night before they started filming the pilot.

In casting the grandparents, Sherman-Palladino had veteran actor Edward Herrmann in mind for Richard and was delighted when he agreed. Kelly Bishop, a fellow New York stage actress, was cast straight after her audition; Sherman-Palladino recalled knowing immediately "and there's Emily". The role of the Stars Hollow diner owner was originally a woman, but the network reported that they needed more men and Scott Patterson was cast as Luke. It was advertised as a guest role, but Patterson said he treated the pilot as "a chemistry test" and he was promptly promoted to series regular.

In the pilot, Sookie was played by Alex Borstein, but she could not be released from her Mad TV contract. She was therefore replaced by Melissa McCarthy, who re-filmed Sookie's scenes. The role of Dean also changed after the pilot, with the original actor replaced by a newcomer Jared Padalecki. The character Lane was based on Sherman-Palladino's friend and fellow producer Helen Pai; Japanese-American actress Keiko Agena was cast in the role when they could not find an appropriate Korean-American actress. Liza Weil auditioned to play Rory, and while she was considered wrong for the part Sherman-Palladino liked her so much that she wrote the role of Paris especially for her.

Writing 

Headed by Amy Sherman-Palladino and Daniel Palladino from seasons 1 to 6, Gilmore Girls had a small writing staff that changed regularly throughout the series. The Palladinos wrote a high percentage of episodes and would review and rework the dialogue in episodes allocated to others. As such, the show is considered to have a distinctive "voice". Sherman-Palladino said "every draft either I write, or it passes through my hands ... so that there is a consistency of tone. It's very important that it feels like the same show every week because it is so verbal." The main job of the writers' room was to help develop storylines and create detailed episode outlines. Notable writers who worked on the show at some point include Jenji Kohan, Bill Prady, Jane Espenson, Rebecca Rand Kirshner, and Janet Leahy.

As signaled by its tagline "Life's short. Talk fast", Gilmore Girls is known for its fast-paced dialogue and "witty repartee". Sherman-Palladino wanted a snappy delivery from the characters because she believes that "comedy dies slow", which required large volumes of dialogue to fill the hour-long time slot. Scripts averaged 80 pages per episode, compared to an "hour-long" average of 55–60 pages, with one page translating to 20–25 seconds of screen time. Scott Patterson later said that the pace of the dialogue led to both him and Lauren Graham quitting smoking—"She needed her wind, and I needed my wind."

Much of the dialogue is peppered with references to film, television shows, music, literature, and celebrity culture. The range of references is broad, summarized by critic Ken Tucker as "some cross between Mystery Science Theater 3000 and Ulysses". Sherman-Palladino wanted the characters to speak this way as an indicator of their worldliness and intelligence, and to cater to a broad audience. At the start, she argued with the network about the frequently old-fashioned references; when she refused to remove a comment about Oscar Levant, she felt the executives adopted an attitude of "Let the crazy woman dig her own grave." The relative obscurity of some of the allusions resulted in explanatory "Gilmore-isms" booklets being included in the DVD sets of the first four seasons.

In contrast to the rapid-fire dialogue, storylines on Gilmore Girls move slowly. Sherman-Palladino's motto was "make the small big, make the big small", which she learned from her days writing for Roseanne. She chose to be "very stingy with events", and the drama is low-key because "sometimes the average everyday things are more impactful". Key incidents often take place off-screen and are only revealed through character conversations, which journalist Constance Grady says is because "On Gilmore Girls, the explosion is never what matters: It's the fallout." The show similarly uses subtext rather than exposition, "where people will talk a great deal in order to obscure what they really mean to say". The writers did not like moments to be overly sentimental, preferring characters to show love through actions and behavior. Sherman-Palladino stated that the network did not interfere or request changes, though there is speculation that she delivered scripts at the last minute to avoid their input.

Sherman-Palladino treated Lorelai as a reflection of herself. Her husband commented: "Amy writing for Lorelai Gilmore has always been really special. No surprise, they're kind of doppelgängers ... Amy and Lorelai are very, very similar. That character is a great cipher for a lot of what Amy is and has been, from the very beginning."

Filming

The pilot episode was shot in the Toronto suburb of Unionville. The rest of the series was filmed at the Warner Bros. lot in Burbank, California. Exterior scenes of Stars Hollow, along with those at Luke's Diner and Miss Patty's dance studio, were all filmed on the backlot — with dozens of background actors utilized to make it look like a functioning town. Production designers regularly had to decorate the town square with fake leaves or fake snow to make it look like a New England fall or winter. Interiors of Lorelai's house and inn, and all scenes at Yale and the Gilmore mansion, were filmed on a sound stage. Very occasionally, the show was filmed on location. The exterior shots of Rory's preparatory school, Chilton, were filmed at Greystone Mansion in Beverly Hills, California. Rory's visit to Harvard was filmed at UCLA, the first visit to Yale was filmed at Pomona College, and subsequent Yale shots were filmed at sound stages in Burbank, California, and USC.

The shot of "Stars Hollow" seen in the first frame of the show's opening credits is actually a panoramic view of South Royalton, Vermont.

Gilmore Girls relied on a master shot filming style, in which a scene is filmed to frame characters and their dialogue together within a long and uninterrupted, single take; often illustrated through another method regularly employed on the show, the walk and talk. Sherman-Palladino explained "There's an energy and style to our show that's very simple, in my mind ... [it] almost needs to be shot like a play. That's how we get our pace, our energy, and our flow ... I don't think it could work any other way."

It took eight working days to shoot an episode, and days were regularly 14–20 hours long. Lauren Graham said: "We filmed alongside The West Wing, and Aaron Sorkin shows are known for having the worst hours ever, they go on and on, but we were always there even after they had gone home, because you couldn't change a word of the script." The cast were required to be word-perfect in all the scenes, while also reciting large amounts of dialogue at speed. Matt Czuchry, who had a main role for the final three seasons, commented, "The pace of the dialogue was what made that show incredibly unique, and also incredibly difficult as an actor. To be able to maintain that speed, tone, and at the same time, try to make layered choices was a great experience to have early in my career. It really challenged me." The combination of the difficult dialogue and long takes meant each scene had to be shot many times; Graham said in 2015: "never before or since have I done as many takes of anything". Alexis Bledel recalled that one scene required 38 takes. Graham added, "That show — as fun and breezy and light as it is — is technically really challenging."

Music 

Gilmore Girls non-diegetic score was composed by singer-songwriter Sam Phillips throughout its entire run. Sherman-Palladino, who served as the music supervisor of the series, was a big fan of the musician and secured her involvement. For the score's instrumental arrangement, Phillips primarily used her voice and an acoustic guitar, and on occasion included piano, violin, and drums. Many of the musical cues are accompanied by melodic "la-la"s and "ahh"s, which developed because Sherman-Palladino wanted the score to sound connected to the girls themselves, almost like "an extension of their thoughts ... if they had music going in their head during a certain emotional thing in their life." Sherman-Palladino felt that the score elevated the series "because it wasn't a wasted element in the show. Everything was trying to say a little something, add a little something to it." Several of Phillips' album tracks are also played in the show, and she made an appearance in the season six finale, performing part of "Taking Pictures".

The theme song is a version of Carole King's 1971 song "Where You Lead". King made a new recording specially for Gilmore Girls: a duet with her daughter Louise Goffin. She was happy that it gave the song "a deeper meaning of love between a mother and her child". King appeared in several episodes as Sophie, the town music shop owner, and performed a brief portion of her song "I Feel the Earth Move" in the revival.

Music also plays a large part in the show as a frequent topic of conversation between characters and in live performances within scenes and at the end of episodes. Musical acts who made appearances include The Bangles, Sonic Youth, Sparks, and The Shins (S04E17). Grant-Lee Phillips appears in at least one episode per season as the town's troubadour, singing his own songs and covers. In 2002, a soundtrack to Gilmore Girls was released by Rhino Records, entitled Our Little Corner of the World: Music from Gilmore Girls. The CD booklet features anecdotes from show producers Amy Sherman-Palladino and Daniel Palladino about the large part music has played in their lives.

Developments

Change of showrunner 

In 2006, the WB merged with UPN to form a new network, The CW. Gilmore Girls survived the merger, being selected as one of seven WB shows to be transferred for a new season, but it resulted in a significant change. In April that year, it was announced that Amy Sherman-Palladino and her husband Daniel could not come to an agreement with The CW and would be leaving the show when their contracts expired that summer. Journalist Michael Ausiello said of the decision: "The thought of Gilmore Girls heading into what is likely to be its final season (and its first on a brand-new network) without its mama or her right-hand man is unfathomable." Discussing the departure later, Sherman-Palladino reflected on the contract dispute in an interview with Vulture, saying:

David S. Rosenthal, who worked on the show as a writer and producer for season 6, was selected by Sherman-Palladino to replace her as showrunner. Commenting on this change, an article in Wired says: "the Palladinos had written the majority of the episodes up to that point, and their distinctive rhythms and obsessions were what defined Gilmore Girls. What remains after their departure is something that seems like Gilmore Girls Adjacent more than anything."

Cancellation
There was speculation during the seventh season that it would be the show's final year, as Graham and Bledel's contracts were both coming to an end. As negotiations continued between the actresses and the network, Rosenthal planned a finale that "could serve as an ending or a beginning of a new chapter and a new season". Graham later said that by the end of the filming schedule "there was a 50/50 chance we'd be returning", and she requested that the finale provide "an opportunity to say goodbye" to the characters, in case of cancellation. Due to the uncertainty, the cast and crew did not have a final wrap party or an opportunity to say farewells.

The CW initially considered bringing the show back for a shortened, 13-episode season but then decided against the idea. On May 3, 2007, shortly before the final episode aired, the network announced that the series would not be renewed. Graham explained that the possibility of returning fell through because "We were trying to find a way we [she and Bledel] could have a slightly easier schedule, and there was really no way to do that and still have it be Gilmore Girls."

Revival 

Because the final season was not written by the series creator, and the new writers had not known that the finale was definitely the last episode, Lauren Graham noted that a lot of fans "were disappointed with how it [the series] ended". In 2009, Amy Sherman-Palladino expressed an interest in pursuing a Gilmore Girls film, to finish the series as she originally intended. Over the following years, fans and journalists continued to ask regularly if the show would return. Privately, Sherman-Palladino stayed in contact with Graham, Bledel, Patterson, and Bishop to discuss the possibility, but nothing came to fruition.

In June 2015, for the 15th anniversary of the show, the cast and showrunners reunited for a special panel at the ATX Television Festival. When asked about a possible revival, Sherman-Palladino told the audience "I'm sorry, there's nothing in the works at the moment." The hype generated by the reunion, however, empowered Sherman-Palladino to pitch new episodes and encouraged Netflix to produce them. In October 2015 – eight years after the show had ended – TVLine reported that the streaming channel struck a deal with Warner Bros to revive the series in a limited run, consisting of four 90-minute episodes, written and directed by Amy and Daniel Palladino. The Palladinos explained that it felt like the right time creatively to continue the story, and that the freedom provided by Netflix made it possible.

The revival miniseries, titled Gilmore Girls: A Year in the Life, was filmed from February to May 2016. Aside from Edward Herrmann, who died a year prior, every cast member who received a main credit on the show returned for at least a scene, while many supporting characters also made an appearance. The sets all had to be rebuilt from scratch, using nothing but photos and footage from the original series. The revival was released on Netflix on November 25, 2016, to positive reviews. There is speculation regarding a possible second revival, with Netflix reportedly keen.

Broadcast history 
Gilmore Girls first season commenced on The WB in the Thursday 8pm/7pm Central time slot, as a lead-in for Charmed. Renewed for a second season, the show was relocated on Tuesdays 8pm/7pm, the time slot of Buffy the Vampire Slayer, which transferred to UPN, and served as a lead-in for Smallville, which became an instant hit and always beat Gilmore Girls in the ratings. During seasons 4 and 5, it led into One Tree Hill, which slowly became a hit. In season 6, it led into Supernatural, which became another hit for The WB and continued on until 2020. Both series were led by former Gilmore Girls actors, with One Tree Hill starring Chad Michael Murray, and Jared Padalecki as a co-star in Supernatural.

First-season reruns aired on Monday nights from March 5 until April 9, 2001, during a mid-season hiatus of Roswell, to build audience awareness of the series. An additional run of the first season aired in 2002 on Sunday nights under the title Gilmore Girls Beginnings (which featured a modified opening sequence voiced with a monologue detailing the premise from Graham), and was one of two shows on The WB to have "Beginnings" in its title for reruns, along with 7th Heaven.

Syndication

In the US, the show began its syndicated release on ABC Family in 2004. The network continued to air the show daily under its new name Freeform until the fall of 2018, when those rights moved to Pop. In October 2015, Gilmore Girls concurrently became available on a second network, UPtv, which continues to air it to this day. Josef Adalian of Vulture commented on the rarity of Freeform and Up carrying a series of its type in syndication: "not that many non-procedural, hour-long shows from the early part of the century—particularly those from a small network such as WB—are still even airing regularly on one cable network, let alone two." Up showed Gilmore Girls 1,100 times in its first year; Freeform aired it 400 times in the same period. From 2009 to 2013, Gilmore Girls also aired in weekend timeslots on SOAPnet.

Since 2016 UPtv has aired a weeklong marathon of all episodes of Gilmore Girls around the Thanksgiving holiday. As the network maintains a family-friendly focus and programming schedule, some minor dialogue edits are made in a number of episodes, mainly when "hell" and "damn" are said, though all episodes are carried.

Gilmore Girls began running on Logo TV in August 2020.

In the UK, the series premiered on Nickelodeon in 2003. Only the first three seasons were shown, with episodes edited for content, and some, like "The Big One", dropped entirely. The series was subsequently picked up by the Hallmark Channel, which gave UK premieres to seasons 4 & 5. It was rerun in its entirety on E4 until January 2012. The show moved to 5Star, then in 2018 changed to daily screenings on the Paramount Network. In Ireland, the series aired its entire run on RTÉ One on Sundays, before moving to TG4. In Australia, from 16 March 2015, Gilmore Girls began airing again at weeknights on digital terrestrial network GEM and in 2022, reruns of Gilmore Girls repeats episodes airing from Saturday afternoons at 4:00 pm on the Nine Network and 9Now.

Home media and online
Warner Home Video released all seven seasons of Gilmore Girls on DVD, in regions 1, 2 and 4, mainly in full-screen 4:3 ratio due to Amy Sherman-Palladino's preference at the time of original release. The full series DVD boxset was released in 2007. Special features include deleted scenes, three behind-the-scenes featurettes, cast interviews, montages, and one episode commentary (for "You Jump, I Jump, Jack").

On October 1, 2014, all seven seasons of the series began streaming on Netflix's "Watch Instantly" service in the United States; all episodes, including the three seasons before The WB transitioned the series to 16:9 HD broadcast from season four on, are in that format. On July 1, 2016, Gilmore Girls became available on Netflix worldwide. All seasons of Gilmore Girls are also available for digital download on the iTunes Store, Amazon.com and other digital sales websites, with all digital sites offering all episodes in HD.

Reception

Critical response 

Upon debut, Gilmore Girls was lauded for the distinct, dialogue-infused style created by Amy Sherman-Palladino, the strength of the dynamic familial themes, and the performances of its cast, particularly leading star Lauren Graham. On Metacritic, the first season has an average rating of 81 out of 100 from 26 reviews, indicating "universal praise".

In the San Francisco Chronicle, John Carman wrote "It's cross-generational, warm-the-cockles viewing, and it's a terrific show. Can this really be the WB, niche broadcaster to horny mall rats?" Caryn James of The New York Times called it a "witty, charming show" that "is redefining family in a realistic, entertaining way for today's audience, all the while avoiding the sappiness that makes sophisticated viewers run from anything labeled a 'family show. Ray Richmond of The Hollywood Reporter declared it "a genuine gem in the making, a family-friendly hour unburdened by trite cliche or precocious pablum," while Jonathan Storm of The Philadelphia Inquirer dubbed it "a touching, funny, lively show that really does appeal to all ages". David Zurawik of The Baltimore Sun called Gilmore Girls "One of the most pleasant surprises of the new season".

For the second-season premiere, Hal Boedeker of the Orlando Sentinel praised the show as "one of television's great, unsung pleasures", and said "Series creator Amy Sherman-Palladino writes clever dialogue and ingratiating comedy, but she also knows how to do bittersweet drama." Emily Yahr of The Washington Post retrospectively called the second installment "Pretty much a perfect season of television". Viewers were concerned that the show would suffer when Rory left for college after season 3, and Yahr commented that the show was not "the same" from this point but gave seasons four and five a positive 7/10.

The last two seasons were less positively received. Maureen Ryan of the Chicago Tribune described the sixth season as "uneven at best", explaining, "the protracted fight between Lorelai and Rory Gilmore left the writers scrambling to cram the show with filler plots that stretched many fans' patience to the limit." The introduction of Luke's daughter has been described as "pretty much the most hated plot device in Gilmore Girls history". Ken Tucker from Entertainment Weekly rated the seventh season "C", describing it as "a death-blow season [which] was more accurately Gilmore Ghosts, as the exhausted actors bumped into the furniture searching for their departed souls and smart punchlines". But he concluded that before this came "six seasons of magnificent mixed emotions" among a "perfect television idyll". Giving the show an overall rating of "A−", he added, "industry ignorance of the writing and of Graham's performance in particular will remain an eternal scandal".

Gilmore Girls was listed as one of Time magazine's "All-Time 100 TV Shows". and was ranked the 87th greatest American television series in TV (The Book), authored by critics Alan Sepinwall and Matt Zoller Seitz in 2016. Entertainment Weekly placed Gilmore Girls 32nd on its "New TV Classics" list, and included the show on its end-of-the-2000s "best-of" list, and The A.V. Club named "They Shoot Gilmores, Don't They?" as one of the best TV episodes of the decade. Alan Sepinwall included the show in his "Best of the 00s in Comedies" list, saying: "Gilmore offered up an unconventional but enormously appealing family ... As the quippy, pop culture-quoting younger Gilmores were forced to reconnect with their repressed elders, creator Amy Sherman-Palladino got plenty of laughs and tears out of the generational divide, and out of showing the family Lorelai created for herself and her daughter in the idealized, Norman Rockwell-esque town of Stars Hollow. At its best, Gilmore Girls was pure, concentrated happiness."

In 2016, Amy Plitt of Rolling Stone reflected on the enduring appeal of Gilmore Girls, and noted that it stood out from other family shows like 7th Heaven, The OC and Everwood by being "far richer, deeper ... The characters were funny and relatable, the banter was zinger-heavy, the familial drama was poignant and the romantic chemistry ... was off the charts."

Ratings 
Viewer ratings for Gilmore Girls were not large, but the numbers were a relative success for the small WB network and it became one of their flagship series. For its first season the show aired in the tough Thursday 8pm/7pm Central time slot dominated by Friends on NBC and Survivor on CBS. Critical acclaim encouraged the network to move it to Tuesday evenings, as part of a push to promote the series and due to the move of Tuesday stalwart Buffy the Vampire Slayer to UPN in the same timeslot. During season 2, ratings for Gilmore Girls surpassed Buffy and it became The WB's third-highest-rated show, with viewer numbers that grew by double digits in all major demographics. For seasons 4–7, Gilmore Girls was up against the US's top-rated show American Idol, which led to a drop in viewers, but with Season 5 it became The WB's second-most-watched prime time show. The series was often in the top 3 most-viewed shows in its timeslot for women under 35.

In its 2016 syndicated release, Gilmore Girls averaged 100,000–120,000 viewers per episode, for an annual viewership of 11 million on each of its networks. The same year, the chief content officer for Netflix, Ted Sarandos, cited Gilmore Girls as one of the streaming channel's most watched shows worldwide.

Awards and nominations 

Gilmore Girls earned several accolades, but did not receive much attention from the major awarding bodies. Its only Emmy nomination was for Outstanding Makeup for a Series, for the episode "The Festival of Living Art", which it won in 2004. Michael Ausiello has attributed this to "a notorious bias against the WB". Recognition did come from the American Film Institute, who named Gilmore Girls one of the ten best shows of 2002, and the Television Critics Association (TCA) who named it Outstanding New Program of the Year in 2001. The TCA Awards also nominated the show for Outstanding Drama in 2001 and 2002, and Outstanding Comedy in 2005. The Satellite Awards nominated it for Best Series – Musical or Comedy in 2002 and 2004, while it was nominated for Favorite Television Drama at the People's Choice Awards 2005. The show was honored by the Viewers for Quality Television with a "seal of quality" in 2000. The series also achieved considerable attention from the Teen Choice Awards, where it received multiple nominations and wins including the award for Choice Comedy Series in 2005.

Lauren Graham was nominated for one Golden Globe Award and two Screen Actors Guild Awards for her work on the first and second seasons, and received five successive nominations at the Satellite Awards. The TCAs nominated her for Individual Achievement in Drama in 2002, then for Comedy in 2006. She also received a Family Television Award, and she won the Teen Choice Award for Parental Unit three times. Alexis Bledel won a Young Artist Award, two Teen Choice Awards, and a Family Television Award. She was also nominated by the Satellite Awards in 2002, as was Kelly Bishop for her supporting performance in 2002 and 2004.

Fandom and cultural impact

Gilmore Girls is considered a cult classic, with an "avid following". During the run of the show this was mostly a small but dedicated group, predominantly of females, but its audience has grown steadily since it came off the air. The series experienced a resurgence when it became available on Netflix in October 2014, introducing it to a new generation of viewers. When the revival was announced in 2015, star Lauren Graham credited it to the campaigning and persistence of the fans. At this point, according to The Washington Post, the show became "a quirky pop culture obsession". The enduring popularity of Gilmore Girls is considered to come from its comforting quality and cross-generational appeal. It is particularly known as a show that mothers and daughters watch together.

The Gilmore Girls Fan Fest has become an annual event since its inauguration in 2016. The unofficial festival takes place in Connecticut over an October weekend, and includes panels with cast and crew, themed activities, and screenings. For the 16th anniversary of the show, 200 coffee houses around the US and Canada were transformed into "Luke's Diners". For two weeks in winter 2018–19, Warner Bros. added a special feature to their studio tour that recreated the Stars Hollow set and displayed props and costumes from the series. The show has an active fandom, posting in internet forums and creating work such as fan fiction. Special Gilmore Girls trivia nights have been held at venues in multiple different cities.

The Irish Independent has commented that "Even though it preceded social media, Gilmore Girls has been internet gold for the past few years. Thanks to its snappy one-liners, it's spawned thousands of memes that have introduced the BuzzFeed generation to its coffee-swilling, cheeseburger-loving, critically-thinking characters." The show has been parodied on Mad TV and Family Guy, and featured in an episode of Six Feet Under. A cocktail bar in Brooklyn devised a menu inspired by the show. Warner Bros. has produced a range of Gilmore Girls merchandise, including T-shirts, mugs, and dolls.

Three collections of academic essays that analyze the show have been published: Gilmore Girls and the Politics of Identity (2008); Screwball Television: Critical Perspectives on Gilmore Girls (2010); and Gilmore Girls: A Cultural History (2019). In 2002, four young adult novels were published that adapted scripts from the first and second seasons into novel form, told from Rory's first-person point of view. There have also been several unofficial, fan-based guides to the series, including Coffee At Luke's: An Unauthorized Gilmore Girls Gab Fest (2007), The Gilmore Girls Companion (2010), You've Been Gilmored!: The Unofficial Encyclopedia and Complete Guide to Gilmore Girls (2020), and But I'm a Gilmore!: Stories and Experiences of Honorary Gilmore Girls: Cast, Crew, and Fans  The program is also the source of a book club, in which followers aim to read all 339 books referenced on the show, and the inspiration for a cookbook called Eat Like a Gilmore.

Gilmore Girls is the basis for the successful podcast Gilmore Guys (2014–2017), which was named by Time as one of the 50 best podcasts of 2017 – the only television-based inclusion. It follows the hosts, Kevin T. Porter and Demi Adejuyigbe, as they watch every episode of the series. Sadaf Ahsan of the National Post commented that it "helped reignite – and, for some, initiate – fan fervour" towards Gilmore Girls.

Notes

References

External links 

 
 

 
2000 American television series debuts
2007 American television series endings
2000s American college television series
2000s American comedy-drama television series
2000s American high school television series
2000s American teen drama television series
American television series revived after cancellation
English-language television shows
Mass media portrayals of the upper class
Teenage pregnancy in television
Television series about families
Television series about single parent families
Television series about teenagers
Television series by Warner Bros. Television Studios
Television series created by Amy Sherman-Palladino
Television shows featuring audio description
Television shows filmed in Toronto
Television shows set in Connecticut
Television shows set in Burbank, California
The CW original programming
The WB original programming